69 (sixty-nine) is the natural number following 68 and preceding 70.

In mathematics
69 is:

 a lucky number.
 a semiprime.
 a Blum integer, since the two factors of 69 are both Gaussian primes.
 the sum of the sums of the divisors of the first 9 positive integers.
 the third composite number in the 13-aliquot tree. The aliquot sum of sixty-nine is 27 within the aliquot sequence (69,27,13,1,0).
 a strobogrammatic number.
 a centered tetrahedral number.

Because 69 has an odd number of 1s in its binary representation, it is sometimes called an "odious number."

69 is the only natural number whose square and cube use every decimal digit from 0–9 exactly once.

69 is equal to 105 octal, while 105 is equal to 69 hexadecimal. This same property can be applied to all numbers from 64 to 69.

On many handheld scientific and graphing calculators, the highest factorial that can be calculated, due to memory limitations, is 69! or about 1.711224524.

In science
 The atomic number of thulium, a lanthanide.

Astronomy
 The Messier object M69 is a magnitude 9.0 globular cluster in the constellation Sagittarius.

In other fields
Sixty-nine may also refer to:
 69ing, a sex position involving each partner aligning themselves to achieve oral sex simultaneously with each other.
 In reference to the sex position, "69" has become an Internet meme, where users will respond to any occurrence of the number with the word "nice" and draw specific attention to it. This means to sarcastically imply that the reference to the sex position was intentional. Because of its association with the sex position and resulting meme, "69" has become known as "the sex number".
 The registry of the U.S. Navy's aircraft carrier , named after Dwight D. Eisenhower, the 34th President of the United States and five-star general in the United States Army.
 The number of the French department Rhône. The Lyon Metropolis, which was separated from the Rhône department in 2015, is designated as "69M". The postal codes for both entities start with "69".
 The Taijitu
 The last possible television channel number in the UHF bandplan for American terrestrial television from 1982 until its withdrawal on December 31, 2011.

References

External links
 

Integers
Internet memes